Kim Sook is a Korean name consisting of the family name Kim and the given name Sook, and may also refer to:

 Kim Sook (diplomat) (born 1952), South Korean diplomat
 Kim Sook (comedian) (born 1975), South Korean comedian
 Kim Sook (activist), Korean independence activist